Patrick Henry Nelson III (March 11, 1910 – June 28, 1964) was an American politician, U.S. Marine veteran of World War II, and attorney from Columbia, South Carolina.

Early life and education
Nelson was born in Columbia, South Carolina, to attorney William Shannon Nelson (1881–1939) and Frances Geddes Nelson. 
After graduating from The University of South Carolina and The University of South Carolina School of Law, Nelson practiced law with Nelson Law Firm, (the firm started by his grandfather, Patrick Henry Nelson II).

Military and political service
In 1941 Nelson joined the United States Marine Corps after the Japanese bombed Pearl Harbor and the United States entered the Second World War. He served in The Fighting Bengals (Marine All Weather Fighter Attack Squadron 224) throughout the war and fought across the Pacific (including the Guadalcanal Campaign, the Gilbert and Marshall Islands campaign, Funafuti, Ellice Islands, and other battles and engagements).

In 1944, while serving in Roi Namur, Marshall Islands, Captain Nelson worked with Charles Lindbergh, who served as an aviation advisor to the Fighting Bengals.

Following the war, he returned home to South Carolina to practice law, and was elected to the South Carolina House of Representatives.

Nelson was also elected as president of the Richland County Bar Association.

Legal career
Nelson worked with his father, William Shannon Nelson (1881–1939), to expand The Nelson Law Firm, to national standing. Nelson would come to run the law firm and continue its expansion. The firm is now the largest law firm in South Carolina. The Nelson Law Firm is now known as Nelson Mullins Riley & Scarborough LLP (commonly referred to as Nelson Mullins) which is a large U.S. law firm and lobby group based in Columbia, South Carolina.

Personal life
He married Elizabeth Juliet Nicholson, of Edgefield, South Carolina, and had three children (including Elizabeth Nelson Adams, artist and poet).

Nelson is the great-grandson of Patrick Henry Nelson, Confederate States Army officer and militia general from South Carolina during the American Civil War.

Death
Nelson was diagnosed with cancer and died at Duke University Hospital, now Duke Cancer Institute, in Durham, North Carolina, at the age of 54.

External links
Patrick Henry Nelson III, The Fighting Bengals Personnel
 Photo of Capt Patrick Henry Nelson III, USMC, Roi Namur, Marshall Islands, 1944
 The Fighting Bengals, Funafuti, Ellice Islands, 1943
 Personnel Listing, Marine Fighter Attack Squadron 224, The Fighting Bengals, Roi Namur 1944
 The Wartime Journals of Charles A. Lindbergh, Roi Namur, 1944

References

1910 births
1964 deaths
People from Columbia, South Carolina
South Carolina lawyers
Members of the South Carolina House of Representatives
20th-century American lawyers
20th-century American politicians
University of South Carolina alumni
University of South Carolina School of Law alumni
United States Marine Corps personnel of World War II